Christine A. Dailey (born September 7, 1959) is an American women's basketball coach, who has been the associate head coach for the Connecticut Huskies women's basketball team since 1988. Dailey was inducted into the Women's Basketball Hall of Fame in 2018.

Early life and education
Raised in New Brunswick, New Jersey, Dailey played prep basketball at St. Peter the Apostle High School.

Dailey graduated from Douglass College of Rutgers University in 1982. She played basketball for Rutgers from 1978-1982 and was a captain in her final two seasons. She graduated with a Bachelor of Science in health and physical education.

Coaching career

Connecticut (asst.)
Dailey was hired as an assistant for UConn in 1985 and was promoted to associate head coach in 1988. She has helped lead UConn to eleven national titles, 25 conference regular season titles, and 24 conference tournament championships. In 2018, Chris Dailey and Mickie DeMoss were inducted into the Women's Basketball Hall of Fame as the only assistant coaches to be inducted.

Acting head coach 
On occasion, the head coach of the team is unable to be present for a game, and head coaching duties are taken on by the most senior assistant. In the case of UConn that is Chris Dailey who was initially assistant coach but then became associate head coach. Although the NCAA rules credit the game result (win or loss) to the head coach of record not to the acting head coach, both the media and fans tend to keep track of the results when an assistant steps in for the head coach.

Auriemma became a head coach in 1985 and made it until 1989 before missing a game.  In the 1988 – 89 season, UConn played a preseason scrimmage against Division III Eastern Connecticut State.  While the game was not intended to be part of the regular season schedule, there were some questions about whether it qualified as a preseason game or as a regular-season game. If it qualified as a regular-season game, it would mean that UConn was guilty of scheduling more regular-season games than permitted. If they played all those games, they would not be eligible for the Big East tournament.  UConn found out about the issue while the season was in progress. Syracuse was gracious enough to cancel the regular-season game against UConn. Even though that solved the problem and permitted UConn to participate in the Big East tournament, UConn administrators decided to impose a suspension for Geno. He would not be permitted to coach the final regular-season game against St. John’s or any games in the Big East tournament.

Dailey stepped in as head coach in the regular-season finale against St. John’s on 25 February 1989 and the team helped her earn her first “win” 73–58.

She was still acting head coach as they played their first game in the Big East tournament against Georgetown.  When Chris Dailey took the court as acting head coach, UConn’s historical record in the Big East tournament was 1–6, with the lone victory being a 52–51 win over Boston College in 1984, before Geno was coach. Geno’s record as a Big East tournament coach was 0-3.

The first game was against Georgetown, and UConn prevailed 85 – 73, resulting in the first Big East tournament win since Auriemma became head coach. The next day, they played Boston College and won easily 65 – 45. This brought them to their first ever conference final game. With Chris at the helm they beat Providence 84 – 65, giving UConn the first ever Big East tournament champion title, and Dailey an unofficial 4-0 career record as acting head coach.

It would be eight more years before Auriemma would miss another game. In 1997, Auriemma’s father passed away, the Friday before the Big East tournament. Dailey again stepped in to take over the head coaching duties. UConn easily won the first game against Villanova 63-45. In the semifinal game, UConn faced Miami, who were leading 16–15 seven minutes into the game, but UConn responded with a 17–2 run to take control of the game. The Huskies ended up winning 98–71. The championship game was against Notre Dame. It was a three-point game halfway through the first half, but UConn ran off 11 consecutive points and Notre Dame never seriously threatened the remainder the game. The final, in favor of UConn, was 86–77. Dailey now had an unofficial 7-0 career record as acting head coach.

Auriemma then went 22 seasons without missing a game. In 2019, Auriemma was ill and decided not to make the road trip to Tulsa and Wichita State. Dailey again stepped in as acting head coach. On 24 February 2019 UConn defeated Tulsa 68–49. Although Tulsa had a 14–9 lead early in the game, UConn took the lead late in the first quarter and the margin was in double digits for all the second half.

Two days later, UConn play Wichita State and Napheesa Collier scored 32 points to help UConn to an 84–47 win to keep Dailey’s consecutive win streak alive, now at 9-0.

In December 2019, Geno missed a game due to scheduled surgery. Dailey took over at the Basketball Hall of Fame Showcase in the Mohegan Sun Arena against Oklahoma. Olivia Nelson-Ododa had 27 points, 15 rebounds and seven blocks to help ensure that Dailey remained undefeated when taking over for Auriemma. The final score was 97–53.

The following season the world was dealing with Covid, and Auriemma tested positive just before the beginning of the NCAA tournament. It was a first-round game. UConn typically has not had difficulty with first-round opponents, and this was no different. With Chris coaching the team UConn beat High Point 102–59. The second-round game was against Syracuse with Dailey still taking over the head coaching duties. Syracuse was within two points early in the second quarter, but UConn opened a 16-point lead by halftime and ended up winning 83–47. Dailey unofficial record extended to 12–0.

During the last season UConn faced Creighton on 2 February 2022. UConn was ranked 10th in the country and Creighton was unranked, so on paper, it didn’t seem like this should be a tough test. However, Creighton scored the first six points of the game and pulled out to a 12-point lead 18-6 late in the first quarter. This was the toughest challenge to date for Dailey’s streak. UConn responded but was still down at halftime. The Huskies outscored the Blue Jays 19–8 in the third quarter and then cruised to a 76–56 win. There were closer final scores, but this probably qualified as the first game where the outcome seemed in doubt.

Auriemma also missed the Basketball Hall of Fame Showcase game during the 2022–23 season. The game against Florida State was almost the opposite of the game against Creighton. UConn was up by 15 at the end of the first quarter and stretched the lead to 23, seemingly on the way to an easy win, but Florida State did not cooperate and cut into the lead, getting the margin down to four, before UConn finished up with an eight-point win 85–77, bringing Dailey’s unofficial record to 14–0.

Our doctor’s orders, Auriemma missed the UConn game against Seton Hall on 21 December 2022. Dailey took over the head coaching duties and presided over again whose outcome was never in doubt. Seton Hall never led, and UConn won the game 98–73, extending Dailey’s record to 15–0.

In January 2023, the team traveled to Indianapolis for games against Butler and Xavier. Auriemma traveled with the team and attended the morning shootaround, but was not feeling well and decided to sit out the evening game so Daley took over again as head coach. UConn scored the first eight points, leading Butler to call a timeout. After Butler scored, UConn also went on a 10 – 0 run. Edwards was dominant for the Huskies outscoring the Bulldogs herself in the opening quarter. Butler did better in the second quarter hitting multiple threes and cutting the lead to five points before UConn closed the half leading by 14. UConn was dominant in the third period, and coasted to the 33 point victory 80 – 47. Daily is now 16 – 0 as acting head coach.

Daily filled in for Auriemma once more in the game against Xavier, when the head coach was unavailable due to illness. Only eight players dressed for the game, and when Edwards crashed into chairs on the sidelines tracking down an errant ball, the team held a route for the rest of the game, leaving them with only seven players for the rest of the game. "We had enough people to finish the game, so that's a good sign," said Dailey, "We've tried holy water. We've tried sage burning. None of them seem to work. It's just something we have to deal with. Whoever we have, we feel like we have enough." UConn started of the game slowly hitting only one of the first nine shots but then started scoring opening up a 31 point by halftime. Griffin had 17 points in the first half, while Juhász went eight for 12 in the game, scoring 18 points. Daily is now 17 – 0 when filling in for Auriemma.

References

External links
 Connecticut Profile

1959 births
Living people
American women's basketball coaches
American women's basketball players
Basketball players from New Jersey
Douglass College alumni
UConn Huskies women's basketball coaches
Rutgers Scarlet Knights women's basketball coaches
Rutgers Scarlet Knights women's basketball players
Sportspeople from New Brunswick, New Jersey